Aleksei Vladimirovich Berezutski (born 20 June 1982) is a Russian football coach and a former player who played as a centre-back.

Club career
He began his professional career in 1999 at the age of 17 at Torpedo Moscow, graduating from the club's famed academy. He is now playing for CSKA Moscow. He tends to play as a central defender but he can play as fullback, wingback, defensive midfielder or even as a winger. He is a defender who can join attacks from the wing. He scored CSKA Moscow's first goal as they came from behind to win the 2005 UEFA Cup Final.

Following his side's Champions League match against Manchester United at Old Trafford on 3 November 2009, Berezutsky (along with colleague Sergei Ignashevich) tested positive for the banned substance sudafed. The two players were provisionally suspended until the case was heard by the European governing body's disciplinary committee on 17 December, according to a UEFA statement. It was later revealed that they had taken a cold medicine which had not been reported, and both players were suspended for 1 game, which was applied retroactively.

In 2014, he scored a 90th-minute equaliser against Roma in the Champions League.

He officially announced his retirement from playing on 21 July 2018.

International career
Berezutski was a Russia national football team regular, making 32 appearances since 2003. 

Aleksei was selected Russia's captain for the 0–3 friendly defeat against Romania, though it was speculated that Hiddink only gave him the captain's armband so he could differentiate between Aleksei and Vasili.

He was confirmed for the finalized UEFA Euro 2012 squad on 25 May 2012.

On 7 March 2018, he officially retired from international football.

Coaching career
On 3 January 2019, Aleksei and his twin brother Vasili joined Dutch club Vitesse as assistant coaches to Leonid Slutsky, who trained them with CSKA and national team.

In February 2021, he joined Vasili as an assistant to Viktor Goncharenko back at CSKA Moscow. In April 2021, Goncharenko moved to FC Krasnodar, with Vasili following him as an assistant. Aleksei remained at CSKA to assist the new manager (and former CSKA teammate) Ivica Olić.

On 15 June 2021, Berezutski was announced as CSKA Moscow caretaker manager after Ivica Olić left his role as manager by mutual consent. A little over a month later, 19 July 2021, Berezutski was confirmed as CSKA's new permanent head coach. On 25 March 2022, Berezutski was named Russian Premier League's coach of the month after CSKA won four games in the preceding month, extending their winning streak to 6 league matches overall.

On 15 June 2022, he left CSKA by mutual consent.

Personal life
Aleksei started to play football in sport school Smena in Moscow, before moving to Torpedo's academy. He is married and has a daughter named Alyona. His identical twin brother, Vasili, is also a professional footballer, coming through the Torpedo academy alongside his brother, who he played with at CSKA too.

Career statistics

Club

Managerial statistics 
As of 21 May 2022

Honours
CSKA

 UEFA Cup: 2004–05
 Russian Premier League: 2003, 2005, 2006, 2012–13, 2013–14, 2015–16
Russian Cup: 2001–02, 2004–05, 2005–06, 2007–08, 2008–09, 2010–11, 2012–13
Russian Super Cup: 2004, 2006, 2007, 2009, 2013
Russia
UEFA European Football Championship: 2008 bronze medalist
Individual
In the list of 33 best football players of the championship of Russia: 2005, 2006, 2007, 2008, 2009, 2010

References

External links
 Player profile on CSKA official website (English)

1982 births
Living people
Footballers from Moscow
Russian footballers
Russia under-21 international footballers
Russia international footballers
FC Moscow players
FC Chernomorets Novorossiysk players
PFC CSKA Moscow players
UEFA Cup winning players
Russian Premier League players
UEFA Euro 2008 players
UEFA Euro 2012 players
UEFA Euro 2016 players
Twin sportspeople
Russian twins
Association football central defenders
Association football fullbacks
Russian football managers
PFC CSKA Moscow managers
Russian Premier League managers
Russian expatriate football managers
Expatriate football managers in the Netherlands